"Flappie" is a novelty song originally recorded by Dutch comedian Youp van 't Hek in 1978. The lyrics describe a boy who is angry with his father for cooking their family's pet rabbit on Christmas. It became a popular song in The Netherlands, and it has been played as part of the rotation of Christmas music every year since its release. Since 2003, it has made regular appearances in the annual Radio 2 Top 2000. In 2020, an English-translated version was recorded by American musician Todd Rundgren.

Real-life cases
Because of the popularity of the song, there has been numerous cases of vandals breaking into rabbit cages around Christmas time, with the intention of re-creating parts of the "Flappie" lyrics. There are also cases where people adopt a rabbit as a pet in December, again with the intention of recreating part of the song. In 2006, the Dutch Animal Protection made a statement that any people who wanted to adopt a rabbit would have to wait until January before they could adopt one. People who have pet rabbits are also encouraged to lock their rabbits indoors during December, to prevent vandals from breaking the cages open and stealing the rabbits.

Todd Rundgren version

In 2020, Todd Rundgren recorded a version of "Flappie" with original English-translated lyrics. He told Rolling Stone magazine that he had been asked to do a Christmas single by Cleopatra Records, and "at first I thought the way I usually think: What can I do that nobody else would think of doing? I found a song that was a hit in Holland, where apparently having a rabbit for Christmas dinner is a fairly commonplace thing, where the kid raises the rabbit until Christmas and then it magically disappears. It’s just a little ditty about the cannibalism of rabbits."

Van 't Hek praised Rundgren's version, saying "Everyone is free to record their own version of it, of course. I also think he did well. When I heard him sing 'Flappie', I thought: 'well, not a bad song at all.'"

References

External links
 News report about freeze in adoption of rabbits during December (Dutch)

Christmas novelty songs
Dutch pop songs
Comedy songs
Black comedy music
Dutch-language songs
1978 songs
Songs about rabbits and hares
Songs about death
Songs about cannibalism
Todd Rundgren songs